John McCue may refer to:
 John McCue (footballer), English footballer
 John B. McCue, member of the Pennsylvania House of Representatives
 John Arthur McCue, member of the Legislative Assembly of Ontario
 J. J. McCue, mayor of Boise, Idaho